Bam is one of the 45 provinces of Burkina Faso. It is located in Centre-Nord Region and the capital of Bam is Kongoussi. In 2019 it has a population of 473,955. It is a rural province with 420,314 of its residents living in the countryside; only 53,641 live in urban areas. There are 229,786 men living in Bam Province and 244,169 women.

Bam is divided into 9 departments:

Twin towns
 Kongoussi is twinned with:
 Canteleu, Seine-Maritime, France
Landerneau, Finistère, France

See also
Regions of Burkina Faso
Provinces of Burkina Faso
Communes of Burkina Faso

References 

 
Provinces of Burkina Faso